The 1130s BC is a decade which lasted from 1139 BC to 1130 BC.

Events and trends
 1137 BC—Ramses VII begins his reign as the sixth ruler of the Twentieth dynasty of Egypt.
 1135 BC—Oxyntes, legendary King of Athens, dies after a reign of 12 years and is succeeded by his eldest son Apheidas.
 1134 BC—Apheidas, legendary King of Athens, is assassinated and succeeded by his younger brother Thymoetes after a reign of 1 year.

Significant people
 Ramesses XI, pharaoh of Egypt, is born (approximate date).